Timi Dakolo (born January 20, 1981) is a Nigerian singer, songwriter, and music producer. He emerged winner of the inaugural season of Idols West Africa in 2007. Accompanying his victory was a recording contract with Sony BMG, in addition to other prizes.

Childhood and early career
Timi Dakolo was born in Accra, Ghana to a Nigerian father, Bayelsa-native David and a Ghanaian mother, Norah Kimmy Head, who died when Dakolo was thirteen years old. Despite being born in Ghana, Timi has a Nigerian passport and does not claim dual citizenship. He was raised in Port Harcourt by his grandmother Ateni Dakolo and his aunt Susan Larry, and he credits his aunt as his early singing teacher. So deep was their relationship that Timi declined an offer to move to Lagos with his parents, opting to stay back in Port-harcourt with them.

Timi started singing in church at the age of twelve. In 2003, he joined the singing group Purple Love as a founding member. They dominated the Port Harcourt club circuit, but disbanded in 2005 as all its members had gained admission into the University of Port Harcourt. Around that same period, Timi won a local talent hunt contest G.E FACTO, which held in Port Harcourt.

Idols West Africa
In 2006, Dakolo auditioned for reality show Idols West Africa in Calabar, Cross River State of Nigeria. Timi Dakolo's songs of choice were Commissioned's More Than I and Lemar's Time to Grow. His vocals impressed the judges, and he was seen as a contender for the prize.

While in the competition, Timi Dakolo was never in the bottom 3. In the final three weeks of the competition it was revealed by the producers of the show that Timi had the highest number of votes each of those weeks.

During the competition, Timi's grandmother died, a week before the viewing of the Top 24 performances. This was a big emotional blow to him. At that time, he turned to his Christian faith for strength to pull through in the competition. Before going to Idols West Africa, Timi was a student of Communication Studies in the University of Port Harcourt.

After Idol
After winning Idol West Africa in 2007, on January 1, 2008, on New Year's Day, Timi Dakolo was shot at the lobby of the Presidential Hotel in Port Harcourt. He had gone to the hotel to attend a church service in the company of his friends. The attack was a random act of violence by a faction of Niger Delta militants and did not target Timi. Although a hotel security guard was murdered in the attack, Timi escaped with a flesh wound, was rushed to the hospital, treated and discharged on the same day.

Timi Dakolo released his first single comprising three songs in October 2009.

In 2011, he released the song "There's a Cry". The music video was filmed in Nigeria. He is currently signed with Lone Records/Now Muzik.

Timi Dakolo is one of the Judges on The Voice Nigeria.

Timi Dakolo released a Christmas album titled "Merry Christmas, Darling" featuring guest duets such as Emeli Sandé and Kenny G in November 2019.

Personal life
Timi Dakolo married Busola Dakolo (née Amupitan) in 2012. They have three children.

Discography

Albums
2011: "Beautiful Noise"
2019: "Merry Christmas, Darling “

Singles
2011: "There's a Cry"
2011: "Great Nation"
2014: "Iyawo Mi"
2015: "Wish Me Well"
2016: "The Vow"
2017: "Medicine"
2018: "I Never Know Say"
2019: "Merry Christmas Darling feat. Emeli Sande"
2020: "Take" Ft. Olamide
2021: "Everything (Amen)"

Awards and nominations
2010: Hip Hop World Revelation of the Year – Nominated, during The Headies
2015: Best Recording of the Year- Wish Me Well

References

External links
 Timi's Official Website
 Idols WA Official Website

Living people
1981 births
Nigerian soul singers
Nigerian musicians of Ghanaian descent
21st-century Nigerian male singers
People from Bayelsa State
Musicians from Accra
The Headies winners
English-language singers from Nigeria
Yoruba-language singers
University of Port Harcourt alumni
Ghanaian people of Nigerian descent